Modra (Latin: Modur) is a city and municipality in the Bratislava Region in Slovakia. It has a population of 9,042 as of 2018. It nestles in the foothills of the Malé Karpaty (Little Carpathian mountains) and is an excellent centre of hiking.

Modra is famous for its pottery industry. Its blue-and-white porcelain is famous throughout Slovakia.
It is also known as one of the most important viticulture centres in the Little Carpathians region.

Besides the main town, there are also other adjacent settlements incorporated in the municipality: former vassalage viticulture village Kráľová and two recreational hamlets of Harmónia and Piesok (also known as Zochova Chata), both located in the woods of Little Carpathians mountains.

Etymology
The name probably originates from another historic geographic name in the neighbourhood, e.g. Modrá hora (Blue Mountain).

History
The first traces of habitation go back into the 3rd millennium BCE and the first permanent habitation comes from the time of Great Moravia, when the Slavs were living there. The first mention about Modra was in 1158 in a document of the Géza II of Hungary, when it belonged to the bishop of Nitra. After the Mongol invasion of 1241 the settlement was reconstructed by the German colonists. The first mention about vineyards goes back to 1321. The settlement received its town privileges in 1361 and became a free royal town in 1607. The town fortifications with three gates were constructed in 1610–1647. Since the 17th century it was one of the leading craft centres in present-day Slovakia. The ceramic industry and majolica production started in the 19th century and in 1883 a school of ceramics was established, where through the skillfulness of Habaners the so-called Slovak ceramics were created. The railway track from Bratislava to Trnava bypassed the town in the 1840s, as the local magistrate refused to allow construction of the railway.

Landmarks

Modra Observatory of the Comenius University in Bratislava near Modra-Piesok
A grave memorial museum (with an external exhibition "Štúrova izba" (memorable room of Štúr) and statue of Ľudovít Štúr, who died here in 1856
Remains of the former fortifications: a bastion (with a gallery of Ignác Bizmayer, pottery master) and the "Upper Gate", the only one of three original town gates to be preserved
A country castle just behind the upper gate; seat of the vineyard school
A Renaissance building from the end of the 17th century
the present-day workshops specialising on the Modra ceramics
Churches:
Roman Catholic Church of St. Stephen the King from years 1873–1876 on the market square
Roman Catholic Church of St. John the Baptist from the 2nd half of the 14th century at the cemetery with the names of victims of the First World War
Evangelical church of Augsburg Confession ("German church") from 1714, present-day form since 1834
Evangelical church of Apostles Peter and Paul ("Slovak church") from 1715, present-day form since 1826, standing near the "German church"
small Baroque chapel of Mary Immaculate from 1740, standing in front of the evangelical churches
Chapel of St. Michael from 1873

Demographics
According to the 2001 census, the town had 8,536 inhabitants. 97.4% of inhabitants were Slovaks, 1% Czechs and 0.4% Hungarians. Structure of religion: 53.7% Roman Catholics, 25.8% Lutherans, and 15% with no confession.

Modra in fiction
In 2010 the Canadian film director Ingrid Veninger made a film about returning to the town after many years in Canada, called MODRA, starring Alexander Gammal and  her daughter Hallie Switzer.

People
Ľudovít Štúr, Slovak writer and politician, lived his last years in Modra and died here
Ondrej Rigo, Slovak serial killer
Svetozar Miletić, Serbian advocate, Journalist, author and politician, studied here at the gymnasium
Stefan Balaz, Architect

Twin towns — sister cities

Modra is twinned with:
 Benátky nad Jizerou, Czech Republic
 Hustopeče, Czech Republic
 Overijse, Belgium

References
Part or whole of the information is based on the corresponding article on the German Wikipedia

External links

 Official website
 Astronomical observatory
 MODRA: Toronto Film Festival
 MODRA: Official site

Cities and towns in Slovakia
Villages and municipalities in Pezinok District
Fortified settlements